Palasport Giacomo Del Mauro is an indoor sporting arena that is located in Avellino, Italy.  The seating capacity of the arena for basketball games is 5,300 people. The arena is primarily used to host home basketball games of the Air Avellino professional basketball team, of the Italian League.

History
Palasport Giacomo Del Mauro originally had a 3,600 seating capacity. It was expanded to a 5,300 seating capacity in 2008, specifically in order to meet the minimum capacity requirements for EuroLeague games, which require an arena of at least 5,000 seats. In 2008, the arena's usage rights were also entrusted to Air Avellino, for a period of ten years.

In addition to the arena being used for the home basketball games of Air Avellino, the main volleyball team of Avellino, Volley Avellino, also uses it as their home arena.

See also
 List of indoor arenas in Italy

References

External links
Air Avellino Site Info

Avellino
Basketball venues in Italy
Buildings and structures in the Province of Avellino
Indoor arenas in Italy
Sports venues in Campania
Volleyball venues in Italy